Valeri Nikitin may refer to:
 Valeri Nikitin (wrestler) (born 1969), Estonian wrestler
 Valeri Nikitin (ice hockey) (1939–2002), ice hockey player